Walid Kowatli aka Walid Al-Kowatli or Walid Al-Quwatli (Arabic: وليد القوتلي‎) is a Syrian theatre director and playwright, known for directing the Lak' bin Lak' written by Emile Habibi and Waiting for Barbarians an adaptation of Waiting for the Barbarians poem by Constantine P. Cavafy.

Early life and education 
Kowatli was born and grew up in Damascus, Syria. He obtained his degree in Theater Direction from the Institute of Art Studies (Krystov Sarafov, formerly) in Sofia, Bulgaria, class of 1973.

Career 
Kowatli headed the Acting Department at the Higher Institute of Dramatic Arts in Damascus from 1991 to 1992, before heading the acting department he joined the institute as a teacher in 1979 to teach the art of acting, the basics of directing and the theater laboratory.

From 1976 to 1999, he was appointed as director at the Department of TV drama in the Syrian Arab TV, where he directed skits and plays the TV a number of them were directed to children and young.

In March 2012, he headed the jury for theater days for the Colleges of Applied Sciences in Oman, and in the sixth Kalba Festival plays short in the UAE in 2017. In the same year, he received the Golden Shield commemorating the Syrian meeting in Dubai.

During the period from 2013 to 2017, he worked on a number of documents addressing Syrian children lost during wartime.
His work was presented on stages such as the Syrian National Theater and Al-Kabbani Theater in Damascus and the Sorbonne Theater in Paris.

Kowatli directed nearly 30 predominantly experimental and poetic plays during his tenure in the theater career, and has worked with the rising generation artists in amateur bands such as Waha Al-Raheb.

Work

Theatre

Television and documentaries 

 2013: The Children of Syria Ascend to Heaven
 2014: Bird of Fire
 2015: Baptized with Fire
 2016: Maram: The Assassination of a Dream

Translations 
 The Fox and the Grapes — play by Guilherme Figueiredo (translated from English)
 Crazy Days — play by Nikolai Gogol (translated from Bulgarian)
 January — play by Yordan Radychkov (translated from Bulgarian)
 The Art of Theater — book by Boris Zakhava (translated from Bulgarian)
 With Water — poet by Salah Stétié (translated from French)

References 

Syrian directors
People from Damascus
Living people
Year of birth missing (living people)